The Celebrezze family is an Italian-American family based in Cleveland, Ohio prominent in the fields of law and politics. They are considered a political dynasty, as three generations have held various forms of office on the federal, state, and local levels, encompassing all three branches of government (Executive, Legislative, Judicial).

Notable members include:

Frank D. Celebrezze (1899–1953), Cleveland municipal judge. Brother of Anthony J. Celebrezze.
Frank D. Celebrezze Jr. (more commonly known as simply "Frank") (1928–2010), Justice of the Ohio Supreme Court 1972-1978, Chief Justice of the Ohio Supreme Court 1978-1986, candidate for Judge of Ohio District Court of Appeal 1994. Son of Frank D. Celebrezze I.
Frank D. Celebrezze III (more commonly referred to as Frank Jr.) (born 1952), Judge of Court of Common Pleas 1992-2000, Judge of Ohio Court of Appeals, 2001–present.  Son of Frank Celebrezze.
Gerald J. Celebrezze (1930-1969), Attorney and Judge of Cuyahoga County, Ohio Common Pleas Court. Son of Frank D. Celebrezze I. 
Bruce D. Celebrezze (1952- ), Attorney and lecturer. Partner at Clyde & Co, LLP. Son of Gerald Celebrezze
William A. Celebrezze (1965- ), Attorney and partner at Goetz & Eckland P.A.  Board member at Open Arms of Minnesota. Son of Gerald Celebrezze
James Celebrezze (1938-2021), Justice of the Ohio Supreme Court 1982-1984, Judge of the Cuyahoga County, Ohio Domestic Relations Court. Son of Frank D. Celebrezze I.
Leslie Ann Celebrezze, Cleveland Municipal Court Magistrate; Judge of the Cuyahoga County, Ohio Domestic Relations Court 2009–present. Daughter of James Celebrezze.
Nicholas J. Celebrezze, Parma, Ohio Councilman, State Representative. Son of James Celebrezze.
Anthony J. Celebrezze (1910–1998), Mayor of Cleveland 1958-1962; Secretary of Health, Education, and Welfare 1962-1965; Judge of United States Court of Appeals for the Sixth Circuit 1965–1980. Brother of Frank D. Celebrezze I.
Anthony J. Celebrezze Jr. (1941–2003), Ohio State Senator 1975-1979, Ohio Secretary of State 1979-1983, Attorney General of Ohio 1983-1991, candidate for governor of Ohio 1990. Son of Anthony J. Celebrezze.
Anthony J. Celebrezze III, candidate for Franklin County, Ohio Clerk 1998. Son of Anthony J. Celebrezze Jr.

See also
List of United States political families
Justice Celebrezze (disambiguation)

References

 
Political families of the United States
American people of Italian descent